40 Golden Greats is a greatest hits album by Jim Reeves. It was released in 1975 and reached number one on the UK Albums Chart, where it was a posthumous number one. Surprisingly, it does not include "I Love You Because".

Track listing

Chart performance

Weekly charts

Year-end charts

Certifications

References

1975 greatest hits albums
Jim Reeves albums